Benjamin Rawitz-Castel (April 24, 1946 – August 29, 2006), was an Israeli classical pianist and piano teacher.

Biography
Benjamin Rawitz-Castel was born and raised in Haifa. After graduation from the Dounie Weizman Conservatory of music in Haifa he continued his studies in Tel Aviv with Ilona Vincze, and at the Tel Aviv University and the Royal Conservatory of Brussels. Rawitz was murdered in the course of a robbery in the apartment where he lived in Brussels.
One of the murderers was 15-year-old Junior Kabunda, a Belgian of Congolese origin. On 20 September 2009, he murdered his 1.5 year old daughter and the 79-year-old grandmother of his girlfriend. He also tried to murder his girlfriend. On December 20, 2010 Kabunda was sentenced to life imprisonment.

Music career
He based his solo and chamber music career in Brussels. He performed in Europe, Israel, Japan and the Americas. Among others, he played with clarinetist Donald L. Oehler and violists Jonathan Bagg and Sergiu Schwartz.

Awards and recognition
 Mozart-Prize, Zurich
 Premio Albéniz, Barcelona
 European Broadcasting Prize

References 

1946 births
2006 deaths
Israeli classical pianists
Israeli music arrangers
Israeli people murdered abroad
People murdered in Belgium
20th-century classical pianists
People from Haifa
Victims of serial killers